This is the list of Space Sheriff Gavan episodes.

Episodes

See also 
 Space Sheriff Gavan: The Movie

References 

Metal Hero Series